Odette Gnintegma (born 22 April 1999) is a Togolese footballer who plays as an attacking midfielder for Moroccan club Raja Ain Harrouda and the Togo women's national team.

Club career
Gnintegma has played for Tempête FC and Athlèta FC in Togo and for Raja Ain Harrouda in Morocco.

International career
Gnintegma capped for the Togo women's national team at senior level during the 2022 Africa Women Cup of Nations qualification.

References

External links

1999 births
Living people
Sportspeople from Lomé
Togolese women's footballers
Women's association football midfielders
Togo women's international footballers
Togolese expatriate footballers
Togolese expatriate sportspeople in Morocco
Expatriate footballers in Morocco